Barry Otto (born 1941) is an Australian actor, primarily of cinema, and an amateur artist.

Early life
Barry Otto was born in Brisbane in 1941, the son of a butcher. He trained as an artist but switched to acting.

Career
Otto received an AACTA Award for Best Supporting Actor in Strictly Ballroom and was nominated for Bliss, Cosi and The More Things Change.... 

Otto portrayed Administrator Allsop in Australia in 2008. He also had roles in The Dressmaker, Kiss or Kill, Dead Letter Office, The Visitor, The Great Gatsby, Legend of the Guardians: The Owls of Ga'Hoole, Love's Brother (see Filmography). In 2015 Otto voiced the role of Mayor Wilberforce Cranklepot, a goanna, in Blinky Bill the Movie.

Personal life
Otto married Lindsay, with whom he has a daughter Miranda (an actress), born on 16 December 1967 in Brisbane. They divorced in 1973.

With his partner Susan "Sue" Hill, he has a son, Eddy (a teacher and professional cricket coach), and daughter, Gracie (a filmmaker and actress), born on 23 May 1987 in Sydney. 

Otto is an amateur artist. He often paints members of his family and has twice entered the Archibald Prize.

Filmography

Awards

Barry Otto at Randwick in Sydney on the Australian Film Walk of Fame.

References

External links

1941 births
Australian male film actors
Australian male stage actors
Living people
Male actors from Brisbane
Date of birth missing (living people)
20th-century Australian male actors
21st-century Australian male actors
Australian male television actors
Australian male voice actors
Blinky Bill